The 2008 Tirreno–Adriatico, the 43rd running of the race, took place from March 12 to March 18, 2008. The race started in Civitavecchia and ended in San Benedetto del Tronto.

Stages

Stage 1 – March 12, 2008: Civitavecchia > Civitavecchia, 160 km

Stage 2 – March 13, 2008: Civitavecchia > Gubbio, 203 km

Stage 3 – March 14, 2008: Gubbio > Montelupone, 195 km

Stage 4 – March 15, 2008: Porto Recanati > Civitanova Marche, 166 km

Stage 5 – March 16, 2008: Macerata > Recanati, 26 km ITT

Stage 6 – March 17, 2008: Civitanova Marche > Castelfidardo, 196 km

Stage 7 – March 18, 2008: San Benedetto del Tronto > San Benedetto del Tronto, 176 km

Jersey progress 

Jersey wearers when one rider is leading two or more competitions
 On stage 2, Alessandro Petacchi wore the points jersey

External links
 

Tirreno–Adriatico
Tirreno-Adriatico
Tirreno-Adriatico